Stromatella is a genus of green algae in the family Kornmanniaceae. It is green.

References

Ulvales
Ulvophyceae genera